Richard Tiffany Gere (born August 31, 1949) is an American actor. He began in films in the 1970s, playing a supporting role in Looking for Mr. Goodbar (1977) and a starring role in Days of Heaven (1978). He came to prominence with his role in the film American Gigolo (1980), which established him as a leading man and a sex symbol. His other films include An Officer and a Gentleman (1982), The Cotton Club (1984), Pretty Woman (1990), Sommersby (1993), Primal Fear (1996), Runaway Bride (1999), I'm Not There (2007), Arbitrage (2012) and Norman: The Moderate Rise and Tragic Fall of a New York Fixer (2016). For portraying Billy Flynn in the musical Chicago (2002), he won a Golden Globe Award and a Screen Actors Guild Award as part of the cast.

Early life
Richard Tiffany Gere was born in Philadelphia on August 31, 1949, the eldest son and second child of housewife Doris Ann ( Tiffany; 19242016) and NMIC insurance agent Homer George Gere (born May 7, 1922). His father originally intended to become a minister. Gere was raised Methodist in Syracuse, New York. His paternal great-grandfather, George Lane Gere (1848–1932), changed the spelling of his surname from "Geer". One of his ancestors, also named George, was an Englishman who came from Heavitree and settled in the Connecticut Colony in 1638. Both of Gere's parents were Mayflower descendants; his ancestors include Pilgrims such as John Billington, William Brewster, Francis Eaton, Francis Cooke, Degory Priest, George Soule and Richard Warren. 

In 1967, he graduated from North Syracuse Central High School, where he excelled at gymnastics and music and played the trumpet. He attended the University of Massachusetts Amherst on a gymnastics scholarship, studying philosophy; after two years, he left and did not graduate.

Career

Gere first worked professionally at the Seattle Repertory Theatre and the Provincetown Playhouse on Cape Cod in 1969, where he starred in Rosencrantz and Guildenstern Are Dead. His first major acting role was in the original London stage version of Grease, in 1973. He was one of the first notable Hollywood actors to play a homosexual character, starring as a gay Holocaust victim in the 1979 Broadway production of Bent, for which he earned a Theatre World Award.

Gere began appearing in Hollywood films in the mid-1970s. Originally cast in a starring role in The Lords of Flatbush (1974), he was replaced after fighting with his co-star Sylvester Stallone. He played a small but memorable part in Looking for Mr. Goodbar (1977) and starred in director Terrence Malick's well-reviewed drama Days of Heaven (1978). The crime drama American Gigolo (1980) significantly boosted his profile and the romantic drama An Officer and a Gentleman (1982) (co-starring Debra Winger) cemented Gere's ascent to stardom, grossing almost $130 million and winning two Academy Awards out of six nominations; Gere himself received his first Golden Globe Award nomination. For the remainder of the 1980s, Gere appeared in films of varying critical and commercial reception. His career rebounded with the releases of Internal Affairs (1990) and Pretty Woman (1990), the latter of which earned him his second Golden Globe Award nomination. The 1990s saw Gere star in successful films including Sommersby (1993) (opposite Jodie Foster), Primal Fear (1996) and Runaway Bride (1999) (which reunited him with his Pretty Woman co-star Julia Roberts). He also took a leading role in the action thriller The Jackal (1997), playing former IRA militant Declan Mulqueen; Gere affected an Irish accent for the role.

Gere was named People magazine's "Sexiest Man Alive" in 1999. Not long thereafter, all in the same year, he appeared in the hit films The Mothman Prophecies (2002), Unfaithful (2002) and the Academy Award-winning musical film adaptation Chicago (2002), for which he won his first Golden Globe Award. Gere's ballroom dancing drama Shall We Dance? (2004) was also a solid performer that grossed $170 million worldwide. His next film, the book-to-screen adaptation Bee Season (2005), was a commercial failure. Gere went on to co-star with Jesse Eisenberg and Terrence Howard in The Hunting Party (2007), a thriller in which he played a journalist in Bosnia. He next appeared with Christian Bale, Heath Ledger and Cate Blanchett in Todd Haynes' semi-biographical film about Bob Dylan, I'm Not There (2007); Gere was one of six actors to portray a variation of Dylan. He co-starred with Diane Lane in the romantic drama Nights in Rodanthe (2008). The film was widely panned by critics (making #74 on The Times Worst Films of 2008 list), but grossed over $84 million worldwide. The film is his most recent to have been produced entirely by a major film studio.

Gere has expressed a belief that his politics regarding China, an important financial resource for major Hollywood studios, have made him unwelcome within Hollywood. He embraced his apparent exile from Hollywood and instead appeared in independent films that garnered some of the best reviews of his career. He was notably singled out for portraying businessman Robert Miller in Arbitrage (2012), earning his fourth Golden Globe Award nomination. Among many positive reviews, Peter Travers of Rolling Stone cited Gere's performance as "too good to ignore" and "an implosive tour de force". Lou Lumenick of the New York Post further wrote that he "gives the best performance of his career". Also in 2012, he received the Golden Starfish Award for Lifetime Achievement from the Hamptons International Film Festival and the Career Achievement Award from the Hollywood Film Awards. He had earlier received an award from the 34th Cairo International Film Festival in December 2010.

Gere made a notable departure from his traditional screen persona with Joseph Cedar's political drama Norman: The Moderate Rise and Tragic Fall of a New York Fixer (2016). The film saw him portray Norman Oppenheimer, a small-time Jewish fixer. Gere himself described the character as an embodiment of the "sides of us we know are annoying and needy". His portrayal of Oppenheimer was called "consistently, completely fascinating" by RogerEbert.com and was singled out as a worthy Academy Award contender by Variety.

Gere is an accomplished musician, composing and performing the Pretty Woman piano theme and a guitar solo in Runaway Bride. He learned tap dance for his role as lawyer Billy Flynn in Chicago, and karate for An Officer and a Gentleman.

Multiple film critics and media outlets have cited Gere as one of the best actors never to have received an Academy Award nomination.

Activism and politics

Gere regularly visits Dharamshala, the headquarters of the Tibetan government-in-exile. He is an advocate for human rights in Tibet and is a co-founder of the Tibet House US, creator of the Gere Foundation, and Chairman of the Board of Directors for the International Campaign for Tibet. Because he supports the Tibetan Independence Movement, he is permanently banned from entering China.

In 1993, Gere was banned from being an Academy Award presenter after he denounced the Chinese government while announcing the nominees.

In September 2007, Gere called for the boycott of the 2008 Beijing Olympic Games to put pressure on China to make Tibet independent. He starred in a Free Tibet-themed Lancia commercial featuring the Lancia Delta. On June 27, 2011, he meditated in Borobudur Temple in Indonesia. He actively supports Survival International, an organization dedicated to protecting the rights and lands of tribal peoples throughout the world.

Gere campaigns for ecological causes and AIDS awareness. He currently serves on the board of directors for Healing the Divide, an organization that supports global initiatives to promote peace, justice and understanding. He helped to establish the AIDS Care Home, a residential facility in India for women and children with AIDS, and also supports campaigns for AIDS awareness and education in that country. In 1999, he created the Gere Foundation India Trust to support a variety of humanitarian programs in India.

On April 15, 2007, Gere appeared at an AIDS awareness rally in Jaipur. During a live news conference to promote condom use among truck drivers, he embraced Bollywood superstar Shilpa Shetty, dipped her, and kissed her several times on the cheek. As a result of that gesture, a local court ordered the arrest of Gere and Shetty, finding them in violation of public obscenity laws. Gere has said the controversy was "manufactured by a small hard-line political party". About a month later, a two-judge bench headed by the Chief Justice of India, K. G. Balakrishnan, described the case as "frivolous" and believed that such complaints against celebrities were filed for "cheap publicity" and have brought a bad name to the country. They ruled that Gere would remain free to enter the country.

Gere contributed some of his writing for the book We Are One: A Celebration of Tribal Peoples, released in October 2009. He discussed the persecution and loss of land of the Jummas as an example of a tragic story that repeats itself in different continents of the world, calling attention to the crime against their peaceful culture and how it reflects on humankind's own relationship with nature and capacity to survive. The royalties from the book's sale go to the indigenous rights organization Survival International.

In 2010, Gere stated that the war in Iraq was not supported by the American people and that the Bush administration had "bullied" Americans into the decision. He called George W. Bush a "very poor president". In a press conference held on the sidelines of the 34th Cairo International Film Festival, he said, "I'm very sorry about what the U.S. has done in Iraq. This war has been a tragedy for everyone. I hope that the people of Iraq can rebuild their country."

In 2016, Gere endorsed Hillary Clinton for president and donated $2,700 to her campaign.

In 2017, Gere criticized Benjamin Netanyahu's policies on the Palestinians and Israel's expansion of settlements in the occupied West Bank, stating, "Settlements are such an absurd provocation and, certainly in the international sense, completely illegal—and they are certainly not part of the program of someone who wants a genuine peace process."

Personal life

Gere had on-again/off-again relationships with actress Penelope Milford from 1971 to 1978, and painter Sylvia Martins from 1978 to 1986. During those years, he was also sporadically linked with Tuesday Weld, Carole Mallory, Dawn Steel, Loree Rodkin, Diane von Fürstenberg, Barbara Carrera, and Barbra Streisand. He was accused of having affairs with Priscilla Presley and Kim Basinger in tell-all books written by Presley's ex-boyfriend Michael Edwards and Basinger's ex-husband Ron Snyder. He has also reportedly dated model Laura Bailey, Tina Chow, Dalila Di Lazzaro, and Padma Lakshmi. He was married to model Cindy Crawford from 1991 to 1995.

In November 2002, Gere married model and actress Carey Lowell. They have a son, Homer James Jigme Gere, who was born in February 2000 and is named for his grandfathers as well as the Tibetan name "Jigme". In September 2013, the two separated after 11 years of marriage. They spent three years in highly contested divorce proceedings in New York County Supreme Court. The case was settled in October 2016. In early April 2018, Gere married Spanish activist Alejandra Silva. In August 2018, they announced that they were expecting their first child. Their son, Alexander, was born in February 2019. In April 2020, the birth of their second son was reported.

Gere's interest in Buddhism began when he was in his 20s. He first studied Zen Buddhism under Kyozan Joshu Sasaki. After studying Zen for five or six years, he and Brazilian painter Sylvia Martins traveled in 1978 to Nepal, where he met many Tibetan monks and lamas. He then met the 14th Dalai Lama in India and became a practicing Tibetan Buddhist (specifically of the Gelugpa school) and an active supporter of the Dalai Lama.

Despite not being vegetarian, Gere has often been erroneously included on lists of famous vegetarians.

Filmography

Film

Television

Awards and honors
In 1995, Gere was the President of the Jury at the 19th Moscow International Film Festival.

On May 17, 2012, Albanian President, Bamir Topi awarded the "Medal of Gratitude" to Gere with the citation: "With gratitude and honor outstanding personality of the world art, great humanist and activist for the protection of human rights, which unmasked and the American public made known, and further, inhuman crimes, ethnic cleansing in Kosovo, in 1999, the Serbian military machine against the Albanian civilian population living in its land." On February 16, 2012, the George Eastman Museum honored Gere with the George Eastman Award for distinguished contribution to the art of film.

References

External links

 
 
 
 
  (May 23, 1998)
 The Gere Foundation
 The Druk White Lotus School (external link) of which Gere is an Honorary Patron
 Melvin McLeod (1 May May 1999) Richard Gere: My Journey as a Buddhist 

1949 births
Living people
20th-century American male actors
21st-century American male actors
Activists from New York (state)
Activists from Philadelphia
American Buddhists
American health activists
American human rights activists
American male film actors
American male musical theatre actors
American male television actors
American people of English descent
Best Musical or Comedy Actor Golden Globe (film) winners
Converts to Buddhism from Protestantism
David di Donatello winners
Film directors from New York (state)
Film directors from Pennsylvania
Film producers from New York (state)
Film producers from Pennsylvania
Former Methodists
HIV/AIDS activists
Male actors from Philadelphia
Male actors from Syracuse, New York
Nonviolence advocates
Outstanding Performance by a Cast in a Motion Picture Screen Actors Guild Award winners
People from Onondaga County, New York
Tibetan Buddhists from the United States